Stiff Street is a hamlet almost on the M2 motorway, near the village of Bredgar, in the Swale District, in the English county of Kent. The nearest town is Sittingbourne.

References 
Philip's Navigator Britain (page 92)

Borough of Swale
Hamlets in Kent